Michael William Studeman (born September 10, 1966) is a United States Navy rear admiral who serves as director of the National Maritime Intelligence-Integration Office and commander of the Office of Naval Intelligence since August 1, 2022. He most recently served as the Director of Intelligence of the United States Indo-Pacific Command from July 3, 2019 to July 2022, and previously was the Director of Intelligence of the United States Southern Command.

Born in Fairfax, Virginia, Studeman graduated from Langley High School in 1984. He attended the College of William & Mary, earning a B.A. degree in 1988. Studeman later completed an M.A. degree in national security affairs at the Naval Postgraduate School in March 1998. His master's thesis was entitled Dragon in the Shadows: Calculating China's Advances in the South China Sea. Studeman also graduated from the National War College in 2016.

He is the son of Navy admiral William O. Studeman and Gloria Diane (Jeans) Studeman. His father served as Director of the National Security Agency from 1988 to 1992 and the Deputy Director of Central Intelligence from 1992 to 1995. On December 28, 1991, Michael Studeman married Brenda Lynne Draper in Middlesex County, Virginia.

References

External links

1966 births
Living people
People from Fairfax, Virginia
College of William & Mary alumni
Naval Postgraduate School alumni
National War College alumni
Recipients of the Legion of Merit
United States Navy admirals
Recipients of the Defense Superior Service Medal